The 1979 Hitachi Trophy was a non-championship race open to Formula Two and Formula Atlantic cars. The race was held at Brands Hatch on 15 April 1979 as a support race for the 1979 Race of Champions. It was won by British driver Norman Dickson in the Dickson's of Perth's March-Hart 792. The Formula Atlantic class win went to Ray Mallock, who finished in fourth place in the overall standings.

Report

Entry
Only nine F2 cars were entered for the event, however of those, only seven took part in qualifying and race compared with the maximum grid of 26 starters which took part in the European Formula 2 race at Thruxton the next day. An additional 16 Formula Atlantic cars were entered, of which five of these did not arrive.

Qualifying

Norman Dickson took pole position, with a lap time of 1:26.2. This time would have placed Dickson 19th on the grid for the Race of Champions race being run the same day. John Cooper was only one tenth of a second behind in his March-Hart 792, with Divina Galica took an encouraging third place.  Next up was Ray Mallock's Ralt-Ford RT1 who was the top Formula Atlantic qualifier in fourth place.

Race

After 25 laps of the Brands Hatch Grand Prix circuit, Dickson took the chequered flag after 35:16.1 mins. of racing, averaging a speed of 111.16 mph. Second place went to Galica, who was the only other driver on the lead lap. She was too eager at the start, however and incurred a 60sec penalty for a false start. Brian Robinson rounded out the podium for the F2 brigade.

Classification

Race

 Fastest lap: Norman Dickson, 1:23.3.

References

Formula Two races
Hitachi Trophy